Asker Skiklubb is a sports club from Asker, Norway.

It was founded on 14 December 1889, and as the name suggests, was initially a cross-country skiing and ski jumping club. Today, however, many individuals (~5000 members) and teams participate in a wide variety of sports, winter and summer as well as sea- and land-based sports. These include—in addition to cross-country skiing and ski jumping—alpine skiing, track and field, orienteering, volleyball, football, handball, kayaking, and biathlon.

Football

Its football section is one of Norway's largest, with the senior women's team annually contending for the national title for many years, until it was moved. The men's team plays in Adeccoligaen from 2011.

References

External links
 Official site

 
Sports teams in Norway
Athletics clubs in Norway
Sports clubs established in 1889
Ski jumping clubs in Norway
1889 establishments in Norway